Etobicoke North is a provincial electoral district in Toronto, Ontario, Canada. It elects one member to the Legislative Assembly of Ontario. It is currently the constituency of Doug Ford, the Premier of Ontario.

It was created in 1999 from parts of Etobicoke—Rexdale and Etobicoke—Humber. At the time, it included all of Etobicoke north of a line following the 401 to Dixon Road to Royal York Road to La Rose Avenue. In 2007, the southern border was altered to follow Dixon Road all the way to Humber River.

Members of Provincial Parliament

Election results

2007 electoral reform referendum

References

External links
Elections Ontario Past Election Results
Map of riding for 2018 election

Ontario provincial electoral districts
Provincial electoral districts of Toronto
Etobicoke